Aleksandr Fomin may refer to:
 Aleksandr Fomin (botanist) (1869–1935), Russian/Soviet botanist and academician
 Aleksandr Fomin, alias of Soviet spy Alexander Feklisov (1914–2007)